Bakhtegan Rural District is a rural district (dehestan) in Bakhtegan County, Fars Province, Iran. At the 2006 census, its population was 7,967, in 1,966 families. The rural district has 16 villages.

References 

Rural Districts of Fars Province
Neyriz County